VA-125 was an Attack Squadron of the U.S. Navy, and was the second squadron to bear the VA-125 designation. It was established as VA-26 on 30 June 1956, and redesignated VA-125 on 11 April 1958. The squadron was disestablished on 1 October 1977. Its nickname was Skylanchers from 1956-1958, and Rough Raiders thereafter.

Operational history
11 April 1958: The squadron’s mission was changed from air-to-ground/surface attack to the indoctrination and training of pilots and enlisted personnel in attack aircraft for assignment to combat carrier squadrons.
11 December 1958: The squadron’s commanding officer, Commander J. E. Thomas, was killed in an aircraft accident.
March 1960: With the addition of the A4D-2N Skyhawk, the squadron added radar and inflight refueling training to its flight syllabus.
19 May 1966: VA-125 was the first squadron in the Navy to receive the TA-4F Skyhawk.
June 1966: The first of several groups of Australians arrived for training by the squadron on the A-4 Skyhawk. The pilots were to form the nucleus of Australia’s first A-4 squadron scheduled for assignment to HMAS Melbourne.
31 March 1969: The last A-4 Fleet Replacement Pilot class began.
30 June 1969: The last A-4 Fleet Replacement Enlisted Maintenance training program was completed.
November 1969: The squadron began to develop the required training program for the Light Attack Weapons School. In December 1969 the squadron, in conjunction with VA-122, inaugurated a graduate level course for the Light Attack Weapons School that involved all phases of attack aviation.
January 1970: The first A-7 Fleet Replacement Enlisted Maintenance and Fleet Replacement Pilot classes began.

Home port assignments
The squadron was assigned to these home ports, effective on the dates shown:
 NAS Miramar – 30 June 1956
 NAS Moffett Field – August 1956
 NAS Lemoore – 24 July 1961

Aircraft assignment
The squadron first received the following aircraft on the dates shown:
 F9F-8B Cougar – Jul 1956
 F9F-8 Cougar – Oct 1956
 A4D-1 Skyhawk – 10 Jun 1958
 A4D-2/A-4B Skyhawk – Aug 1958
 A4D-2N/A-4C Skyhawk – 03 Mar 1960
 AD-5/A-1E Skyraider – Sep 1960
 A-4E Skyhawk – Dec 1962
 TA-4F Skyhawk – 19 May 1966
 A-4F Skyhawk – Feb 1968
 A-7B Corsair II – 25 Sep 1969
 A-7A Corsair II – Oct 1969
 A-7C Corsair II – Aug 1975

See also
 VA-125 (U.S. Navy)
 Attack aircraft
 List of inactive United States Navy aircraft squadrons
 History of the United States Navy

References

Attack squadrons of the United States Navy
Wikipedia articles incorporating text from the Dictionary of American Naval Aviation Squadrons